Ypsilotera Monastery, also known as Kalligrafon Monastery (Καλλιγράφων), is a former Eastern Orthodox monastery that is part of the Meteora monastery complex in Thessaly, central Greece.

Names
Other names for the monastery include:
Μονή της Θεοτόκου της Υψηλοτέρας Πέτρας (Monastery of Theotokos of the Highest Rock)
Μονή των Καλλιγράφων (Monastery of Calligraphy)
Εισοδίων της Θεοτόκου (Entry of the Theotokos)
Μονή του Δωροθέου (Monastery of Dorotheos)

Description
The monastery was famous for its manuscripts and calligraphers. It was founded in 1347 by Paschalis of Kalambaka. It is located on Ypsilotera Rock (585.7 m) next to the "Devil's Tower," a geological rock formation that is between the Monastery of St. Nicholas Anapausas and Monastery of Varlaam.

The best views of the monastery ruins can be seen from the Monastery of Great Meteoron and the Monastery of Varlaam. The Holy Monastery is located on a lower rock that is directly adjacent to Ypsilotera Rock.

References

Meteora